Rules of Travel is a studio album by singer-songwriter Rosanne Cash, released in 2003. It was her first album of new material in nearly seven years. On the track "September When It Comes," she is joined by her father Johnny Cash; Johnny Cash would in fact die in September 2003, making this one of the last recordings to be released during his lifetime.

Track listing

Musicians
Rosanne Cash: vocals, acoustic guitar
Johnny Cash: vocals
Steve Earle: vocals
Sheryl Crow: harmony vocals
Teddy Thompson: harmony vocals
Catherine Russell: Background vocals
John Leventhal: guitars, bass guitar, organ, wurlitzer, keyboards, percussion
Zev Katz: bass guitar, upright bass
Michael Rhodes: bass guitar
Doug Petty: organ
Danny Louis: organ
Larry Farrell: trombone
Rick Depofi: tenor saxophone
Tony Kadlek: flugelhorn
Shawn Pelton: drums, percussion
Dennis McDermott: drums, percussion
Matt Keeler: drums
Craig Northey: hand drum

Chart performance

References

2003 albums
Rosanne Cash albums
Albums produced by John Leventhal
Capitol Records albums